Opera has long been part of the musical culture of New Orleans, Louisiana. Operas have regularly been performed in the city since the 1790s, and since the early 19th century, New Orleans has had a resident company regularly performing opera in addition to theaters hosting traveling performers and companies.

Earlier opera houses
Operas were staged at a variety of theaters in the city, the first documented was André Grétry's Sylvain at the Theatre de la Rue Saint Pierre on 22 May 1796. On 30 January 1808, the Théâtre St. Philippe was opened with the U.S. premiere of Étienne Méhul's Une folie.  The U.S. premiere of Luigi Cherubini's Les deux journées took place at this theater on 12 March 1811. The city's most famous opera venue between 1819 and 1859 was the Théâtre d'Orléans. That theater was succeeded in 1859 by the French Opera House, located on Bourbon Street in the French Quarter. Living in a cosmopolitan city, New Orleans' inhabitants, whether high in status or low, imported or indigenous, constituted a highly receptive audience.

The French Opera House burned down in 1919, causing severe disruption to opera in the city. When attempts to arrange financing for rebuilding failed, the company disbanded. For a generation, most opera in New Orleans was presented by touring companies at various local theaters.

The modern era
In 1943, the New Orleans Opera Association was formed, and succeeded in securing a resident company in the city. Over the years, many noted singers have appeared with the company (see List of opera singers).

Since World War II, various companies have toured to New Orleans. In 1947, the Metropolitan Opera visited with their productions of Le nozze di Figaro (with Ezio Pinza and Eleanor Steber), La traviata (with Bidu Sayão) and Lucia di Lammermoor (with Patrice Munsel). They returned in 1972, with Otello (with James McCracken and Sherrill Milnes), Faust (with Plácido Domingo and Ruggero Raimondi), La traviata (with Anna Moffo) and La fille du régiment (with Dame Joan Sutherland and Luciano Pavarotti).

The Opera Association has presented two world premieres:  Carlisle Floyd's Markheim (with Norman Treigle and Audrey Schuh, 1966) and Thea Musgrave's Pontalba (conducted by Robert Lyall, 2003).

In November 1967, the American National Opera Company presented two operas in New Orleans:  Lulu and Tosca (the latter with Marie Collier), both in productions staged by Sarah Caldwell.

In 1975, the New Orleans Opera Association staged the epic Les Huguenots with Marisa Galvany, Rita Shane, Susanne Marsee, Enrico di Giuseppe, Dominic Cossa, and Paul Plishka heading the cast.

As part of the 1984 Louisiana World Exposition, the English National Opera gave performances of Rigoletto (in Sir Jonathan Miller's well-known production), Patience and Gloriana. 

Also based in New Orleans, though short-lived, The New Opera Theatre (1986–1990) presented two world premieres as well as experimental productions of standard repertory. Their staging of Dido and Æneas toured to New York (Symphony Space), where it was acclaimed. Featured singers with this ensemble included Cyril and Libbye Hellier, Tracey Mitchell, Natalia Rom, Thaïs St Julien, Phyllis Treigle, and Susannah Waters.

In 1992, New York-based Opera Quotannis brought their production of New Orleans-born composer Louise LaBruyère's Everyman to the Crescent City, with Mitchell in the title role.

Hurricane Katrina, in 2005, flooded the Theatre for the Performing Arts and the season was cancelled, but the New Orleans Opera has since returned.

On 17 January 2009 the New Orleans Opera, directed by Robert Lyall, performed with Plácido Domingo in a gala reopening of New Orleans' Mahalia Jackson Theater of the Performing Arts. The master of ceremonies was New Orleans native Patricia Clarkson.

Seasons

List of opera singers
Over the years many celebrated opera singers have appeared with the Association, including:

References

External links
 The Metropolitan Opera Encyclopedia, edited by David Hamilton, Simon and Schuster, 1987. 
 New Orleans Opera
 Finding aid to the New Orleans Opera Association Archives at Loyola University New Orleans
 Digitized selections from the New Orleans Opera Association Archives at Loyola University New Orleans
 New Orleans Opera Association Timeline at Loyola University New Orleans

French Quarter
American opera companies
Music of New Orleans
Performing arts in Louisiana